The Communist Party of Thailand (Abrv: CPT;) was a communist party in Thailand active from 1942 until the 1990s.

Initially known as the Communist Party of Siam, the party was founded officially on 1 December 1942, although communist activism in the country began as early as 1927. In the 1960s, the CPT grew in membership and support and by the early 1970s was the second largest communist movement in mainland Southeast Asia (after Vietnam). The party launched a guerrilla war against the Thai government in 1965. Even though the CPT suffered internal divisions, at its political peak the party effectively acted as a state within the state. Its rural support is estimated to have been at least four million people; its military arm consisted of 10–14,000 armed fighters. Its influence was concentrated in the northeastern, northern and southern Thailand. Following a series of internal party disputes, changes in international communist alliances, successful counter-insurgency policies of Thailand's government including a widely accepted offer of amnesty for party cadres, and the Cold War coming to its conclusion, the party disappeared from the political scene in the early-1990s.

1920s–1930s
The origins of the communist movement in Thailand begin with the founding of the Siam Special Committee of the South Seas Communist Party between 1926 and 1927. An infusion of leftists fleeing China for Thailand in the late 1920s following the Nationalist-Communist split of 1927 also increased support for activities. Accounts vary, but sometime between late 1929 and early 1930 the Communist Party of Siam was inaugurated.

1940s–1950s: Party creation
During its initial phase of existence, the Communist Party of Siam remained a small party. It mainly comprised intellectuals in Bangkok. By early-1948, British intelligence sources deemed reports that the party had 3,000 members nationwide as "exaggerated". The party enjoyed a brief period of legality from 1946 to 1948. The secret party headquarters were in a wooden building on Si Phraya Road, Bangkok.

A CPT delegation attended the second national congress of the Communist Party of Vietnam (CPV) in Tuyen Quang in February 1951.

The CPT held its second party congress in 1952.

1960s: The People's War

In 1960, the party attended the International Meeting of Communist and Workers Parties held in Moscow.

The CPT held its third party congress in September 1961. In the Sino-Soviet split, the CPT sided with the Communist Party of China. In October 1964, its position was made clear in a congratulatory message on the occasion of the 15th anniversary of the People's Republic of China. Ideologically, the party aligned with Maoism. In 1961, it formulated a policy of armed struggle along the lines of the Chinese experience, which was made public in 1964. The party condemned the Communist Party of the Soviet Union as revisionist and socially imperialist. As of 1966, relations with the Communist Party of Vietnam began to deteriorate, as the CPT criticized the CPV for failing to take a clear pro-China stance.

The Voice of the People of Thailand (VOPT), a CPT radio station, was established in Yunnan, southern China in March 1962.

The party launched the Thai Patriotic Front (TPF) on 1 January 1965. The TPF had a six-point programme for peace and neutrality. The Front called for the formation of a patriotic and democratic government, and opposed the Thai government and US troop presence in Thailand. The TPF was poised to fill the role of the united front in the triangular setting of the people's war strategy (party-army-front).

Low intensity armed struggle began in August 1965 when the party declared through VOPT that "an era of armed struggle had begun". Concomitantly, the party began armed actions in the Na Kae District of Nakhon Phanom Province. At the time it was estimated that the party had around 1,200 armed fighters under its command.

Opposition to US military presence in Thailand was a key element of the CPT during the Vietnam War. The CPT alleged that Thailand was a neocolonial country under US control. Emphasis was thus given to the struggle for national independence. As of 1968, the theory of neocolonialism was rejected by large sections of the party, who were inspired by Maoist positions arguing that Thailand was a semi-colonial country.

As of 1968, the CPT guerrilla network consisted of less than 4,000 armed fighters, scattered across the northern mountains and other periphery regions. The CPT guerrilla had limited links to outside support.

In 1969, the Supreme Command of the People's Liberation Army of Thailand was formed, marking a new phase in the build-up of guerrilla forces. The armed struggle had spread to various districts in the north in the Phetchabun Mountains and the Phi Pan Nam Range. The armed forces of the party had also established a presence along the border with Malaysia, in the areas were the armed forces of the Communist Party of Malaya was based.

In July 1969, nine CPT members were arrested, including a high-ranking Central Committee member. The arrests were presented by the government as a crucial victory over the party.

1970s: Peak
From 1970 on, the People's Liberation Army of Thailand (PLAT) received significant logistical support from China and Vietnam. PLAT forces intensified their operations, including attacks on US Air Force bomber bases in the country.

When Thailand and the People's Republic of China established diplomatic relations in 1975, an announcement on VOPT hailed this development.

In the aftermath of the 6 October 1976 Massacre at Thammasat University and in the climate of increasing repression after the military take-over of the country, the CPT was able to expand its membership base. Many of the new recruits were students, workers, intellectuals, farmers or cadres of the Socialist Party of Thailand. More than 1,000 students joined the party, including most elected campus representatives throughout the country. A large section of the newly recruited members received political and military training in PLAT camps in Laos. Instructors were Thai, Lao, and Vietnamese.

In many cases students accustomed to urban life had difficulties adapting to the harsh realities of guerrilla struggle, and thus the party decided to place many of them in villages rather in deep jungle. The new student recruits were divided into groups of five to ten, which were distributed along the approximately 250 "liberated villages" of the country.

By 1977, the party had an estimated 6,000 to 8,000 armed fighters, and about a million sympathizers. Half of the provinces of the country were declared "communist infiltrated" by official Thai sources at the time.

The entry of leftist intellectuals to the party strengthened its capability to pursue united front policies. Following the expansion of its membership, the CPT began to stretch out a hand to wider sections of Thai society for forming a broad democratic front. On 7 May 1977, the Socialist Party of Thailand (SPT) declared that it would cooperate in armed struggle with the CPT. On 2 July the two parties declared the formation of a united front.

On 4 October, VOPT declared the formation of the Committee for Coordination of Patriotic and Democratic Forces on 28 September. The nine-member coordination committee consisted of
Chairman: Udom Srisuwan (CPT Central Committee Member)
Vice Chairman: Boonyen Wothong (SPT)
Committee Member: Monkon Na Nakhon (CPT)
Committee Member: Therdphum Chaidee
Committee Member: Sithon Yotkantha (farmers movement)
Committee Member: Samak Chalikun (Socialist United Front Party)
Committee Member: Chamni Sakdiset
Spokesman and Committee Member: Sri Inthapathi (formerly working for the Public Relations Department of the government)
Secretary: Thirayut Boonmi (students movement and editor of Samakhi Surop (United to Fight), a magazine being circulated among students and intellectuals both in Thailand and abroad).

Aligned with the CPT at the time were also the Thai Moslem People's Liberation Armed Forces and the National Student Center of Thailand.

Shifting alliances
The military and political growth of the party would however be hampered by developments wider afield. The party depended on support from states and communist parties in neighbouring countries, and as international alliances shifted the CPT found itself vulnerable.

In late 1978, the Sino-Soviet split developed into armed hostilities in Southeast Asia as war broke out between Vietnam and Kampuchea, two countries that supported the CPT. Laos, a country which hosted many PLAT bases, sided with Vietnam in the dispute. In January 1979, the CPT and PLAT were expelled from Laos by the government, a military setback for the party. Bunyen Worthong and a small section of other ex-student leaders and intellectuals broke with the party leadership and on 22 October 1979, they formed the Thai Isan Liberation Party (generally called Pak Mai, the 'New Party') in Vientiane. Pak Mai was a communist party that supported Vietnamese-Laotian positions and was based in Laos.

Initially, the CPT adopted a neutral stance in the conflict between Vietnam and Kampuchea, causing relations to deteriorate with both the Chinese and the Vietnamese parties. However, as Vietnam intervened militarily in Kampuchea, the CPT condemned the Vietnamese action in a statement issued on 7 June 1979.

As diplomatic and trade relations between Thailand and China improved, and Thai and Chinese governments found a common enemy in pro-Soviet Vietnam, moral and logistical support for the CPT by the Chinese declined sharply. The Communist Party of China began advising the CPT to tone down their revolutionary discourse against the Thai government in their radio broadcasts and to support Democratic Kampuchean forces against the Vietnamese. On 10 July 1979, VOPT declared that it would cease to its broadcasting service. On 11 July, the last VOPT broadcast was transmitted. Renmin Ribao carried a congratulatory message from the CPT on the 30th anniversary of the People's Republic of China on 30 September, which called for militant unity between Thai and Chinese communists, but thereafter news about the CPT in Chinese media became scarce.

1980s: Decline

In 1980, the Thai government adopted a government order, "66/2523", encouraging CPT cadres to defect. Communist cadres were eventually granted amnesty.

In March 1981, the Socialist Party of Thailand broke off relations with the CPT, claiming that CPT was controlled by foreign influences.

In April 1981, the CPT leadership sought talks with the Thai government. The government responded that CPT fighters had to demobilize before any talks could be initiated. In a declaration on 25 October 1981, Major General Chavalit Yongchaiyudh, the director of the Thai Army Operations Department, said that the war against CPT armed forces was approaching its end as all major bases of the PLAT in the north and northeast had been destroyed.

In 1982, the government, under Prime Minister General Prem Tinsulanonda, issued another executive order, 65/2525, offering amnesty to CPT-PLAT fighters.

In 1982–1983, CPT experienced mass defections of its cadres, and its military potential was severely reduced. Many of those who defected in the early 1980s were the students and intellectuals who had joined CPT after the 1976 massacre. The defectors generally rejected the Maoist ideological positions of the CPT, arguing that Thailand was emerging as an industrial nation and the peasant war strategy had to be abandoned.

Damri Ruangsutham, an influential politburo member, and Surachai Sae Dan, a leading figure of the party in southern Thailand, were captured by state forces at that time.

There have been no reports of CPT activity since the beginning of the 1990s. The exact fate of the party is not known, and it remains banned to this day.

Party organization
As of the 1970s, the party was led by a seven-member politburo, elected by a 25 member Central Committee. Under the Central Committee were various provincial (changwat) committees and under them district (amphoe) committees. At the local level there were tambon (subdistrict) and muban (village) party structures.

Information on the leadership of the CPT is scarce. The CPT itself was always secretive about the identity of its leaders. According to a 1977 Kampuchean document, it was claimed that the General Secretary of the CPT was Khamtan (nom de guerre of Phayom Chulanont). Other sources mention "Comrade Samanan" (Jaroen Wanngam) as the party leader during the same period.

Ethnic composition
Prior to the formation of the Communist Party of Siam, the Communist Party of China had an active exile branch working among ethnic Chinese in the country. The party obtained legal status in 1946, and had a major influence on trade unions and Chinese students. The party had around 2,000 active members and another 3,000 sympathizers in Siam. After the establishment of the People's Republic of China in 1949 most Chinese communists in Thailand joined the CPT. From 1949 until 1976, the party membership was largely ethnically Chinese. Following the rapid expansion of the party following the 1976 massacre, ethnic Thais came to constitute the majority of party members. There was also a strong presence of other ethnic minorities in the party ranks. While many Hmongs in neighbouring Laos tended to side with anti-communist forces, the CPT was able to build a strong base among Hmong people in Thailand.

See also
 Mahachon (newspaper)

References

External links
List of incidents attributed to the Communist Party of Thailand on the START database
The Road to victory : documents from the Communist Party of Thailand Chicago : Liberator Press, 1978

1942 establishments in Thailand
Banned communist parties
Banned political parties in Thailand
Communism in Thailand
Communist insurgency in Thailand
Thailand
Defunct communist militant groups
Defunct communist parties
Defunct Maoist parties
Defunct political parties in Thailand
Factions of the Third Indochina War
Maoism in Asia
Political parties established in 1942
Rebel groups in Thailand
Socialist parties in Thailand